Jeotgalicoccus is a genus of Gram-positive, facultatively anaerobic, and halotolerant to halophilic bacteria. The cells are coccoid. The genus is named after the Korean fish sauce jeotgal, whence these bacteria were first isolated.

References

Further reading

 
Staphylococcaceae
Bacteria genera